FC Schalke 04 is a German football club based in Gelsenkirchen. The club was founded in 1904. They currently compete in the Bundesliga.

The following are lists of Schalke 04 players since the formation of the Bundesliga in 1963 and notable club players of the pre-Bundesliga era.

Players

Bundesliga era
All 512 players who made at least one appearance in a competitive match for Schalke 04 since August 1963 are listed below. 468 of them played in the Bundesliga, which is a record for the league.
316 players scored at least one goal for the club. 277 of them scored in the Bundesliga, which is also a record for the league.

Nation: 

Position: GK = Goalkeeper (42 players), DF = Defender (143), MF = Midfielder (186), FW = Forward (141)

League membership: Bundesliga (1963–1981, 1982–1983, 1984–1988, 1991–2021, 2022–), 2. Bundesliga (1981–1982, 1983–1984, 1988–1991, 2021–2022)

Total competitive matches (2471): Bundesliga (1823), 2. Bundesliga (224), DFB-Pokal (202), UEFA Cup / Europa League (100), Champions League (70), Ligapokal (22), Cup Winners' Cup (14), UI Cup (12), Supercup (2), Relegation play-offs (2)

Statistics correct .

Pre-Bundesliga era
Notable players for Schalke 04 before 1963 are listed below.

Position (Pos): GK = Goalkeeper, DF = Defender, MF = Midfielder, FW = Forward

German championship participations: (titles in bold):
1927, 1928, 1929, 1930, 1932, 1933, 1934, 1935, 1936, 1937, 1938, 1939, 1940, 1941, 1942, 1943, 1944, 1951, 1952, 1956, 1958, 1962

Total competitive matches (since 1922): Oberliga West (468), Gauliga Westfalen (206),  Gauliga Ruhr (141),  German championship (116), DFB-Pokal (53), Western German championship (43), Westphalian / Western German Cup (41), Emscher-Kreisliga (39), Landesliga Westfalen (34), European Cup (7), Bundesliga, i.a.

Captains
All club captains since 1916.

See also
 List of FC Schalke 04 records and statistics

Sources

References

 
Players
Schalke 04
Schalke 04
Schalke 04